Camaño is a surname. Notable people with the surname include:

 Aída Camaño (born 1984), Uruguayan football player
 Eduardo Camaño (born 1946), Argentine politician
 Graciela Camaño (born 1953), Argentine lawyer and politician
 Iker Camaño (born 1979), Spanish cyclist
 Melitón Camaño (1868–1931), Argentine journalist

See also
 Camano (disambiguation)
 Caamaño